Kot Sundki is a village  situated in the Attock District of Punjab Province in Pakistan. The Islamabad-Peshawar motorway is about 7 km away from village of Kot Sundki. 

It is 15 km far away from Pakistan Ordnance Factories and Wah Cantonment, and 20 km from Hassan Abdal.

References

Villages in Attock District